Lewis Blaine Hershey (September 12, 1893May 20, 1977) was a United States Army general who served as the second Director of the Selective Service System, the means by which the United States administers its military conscription.

Early life
He was born in Steuben County, Indiana, son of Latta Freleigh Hershey (1858–1938) and Rosetta Caroline Richardson (1862–1898). He attended the local public schools and graduated from Tri-State College (now Trine University) in 1914 receiving a degree in education. He taught at local elementary schools and served as a school principal in Indiana.

He married Ellen Dygert (1892–1977) and had four children: Kathryn, Gilbert, George, and Ellen.

Military
Hershey enlisted in the Indiana National Guard in 1911. Hershey received a direct commission as a second lieutenant in 1913. In 1916, his guard unit was called to active duty on the Mexican border. The unit was relieved in December 1916. His unit was again called to federal service during World War I and sent to France with the American Expeditionary Force.

Hershey was raised a Master Mason in Northeastern Lodge 210, Fremont, Indiana, in 1916.

After the war, Hershey remained in the National Guard until he received a regular commission as a captain in the Regular Army in 1920. He attended the Command and General Staff College and the Army War College. Hershey taught military science at the Ohio State University and then served in the general staff as G-4 at the Department of Hawaii.

Career
In 1936, he was assigned to the General Staff in Washington, DC. In October 1940, President Franklin Roosevelt promoted him to brigadier general and named him executive officer of the Selective Service System. On July 31, 1941, President Roosevelt named Hershey director of the Selective Service. In 1942, Hershey was promoted to major general. In 1943, he received an honorary degree in Doctor of Laws from Oglethorpe University. While officially retiring on December 31, 1946, he was retained on active duty starting the next day.

He was the longest-serving director in the history of the Selective Service System, and held the position until February 15, 1970, spanning World War II, the Korean War and the Vietnam War.

General Hershey was one of only six generals in the history of the United States Army to have served as a general during three major conflicts. The other five were Brevet Lieutenant General Winfield Scott (War of 1812, Mexican War and Civil War), General of the Army Douglas MacArthur (World War I, World War II and Korea), Lieutenant General Milton Reckord (World War II, Korea, Vietnam), Major General Leo Boyle (World War II, Korea, Vietnam), and General Hugh Shelton (Panama, Gulf War, War on Terror). (Generals Reckord and Boyle were both long serving state adjutants general in the National Guard.)

Hershey was promoted to lieutenant general in 1956 and to four-star general on December 23, 1969.

On October 24, 1967, in response to increasing demonstrations against military recruiting on college campuses, Hershey issued Local Board Memorandum No. 85, since known as the Hershey Directive, which recommended that when a draft card was abandoned or mutilated that registrant should be declared "a delinquent for failure to have the card in his possession" and then be reclassified as available for service. Two days later, he sent a letter to local boards suggesting that violators of any portion of the Selective Service Act or Regulations be treated as delinquent. Notably, he said that such violations included "illegal activity which interferes with recruiting," which was assumed to mean demonstrating against military recruiters. Unlike the Memorandum, the letter was unofficial. This order outraged students, many of whom were not subject to being drafted due to education deferments, and campus demonstrations against the war (and Hershey's order) increased. Various Supreme Court cases voided the Memorandum, and after one of them Hershey withdrew it with Memorandum No. 101, on January 21, 1970. The most explicit overruling of the Memorandum and Letter came in a decision from the United States Court of Appeals Third Circuit in Bucher v. Selective Service System on January 2, 1970, which ruled that there is "no statutory authorization for such reclassification," but did not rule on First Amendment issues:

Since we have reached the conclusion that the delinquency reclassifications here are invalid for the separate and independent reasons that (1) they violate the constitutional procedural due process guarantees of the Fifth and Sixth Amendments, and (2) they lack statutory authorization, we find it unnecessary to advert to the plaintiffs' contention that the reclassifications violate their First Amendment rights.

(Many online articles erroneously refer to Bucher v. Selective Service System as a Supreme Court decision.)

The controversy over the Hershey Directive led to calls for his retirement. On February 15, 1970 President Richard Nixon appointed Hershey as Presidential Advisor for Manpower Mobilization and Hershey vacated the office of Director of the Selective Service.

Retirement
As required by law, Hershey was involuntarily retired from the Army on April 10, 1973, at the age of 79, as a four-star general. He was one of the very few members of the U.S. Army to be allowed to serve beyond the mandatory retirement age of 64 since it was established shortly after the American Civil War.

Hershey died in Angola, Indiana on May 20, 1977 (only a month after his wife's death) and he is interred in Section 7 of Arlington National Cemetery.

Hershey was a recipient of the prestigious Silver Buffalo Award from the Boy Scouts of America. He was a Scout leader and executive in Washington, DC. His previous awards from the Boy Scouts included the Silver Beaver Award and the Silver Antelope Award.

Hershey was one of only three Army officers to have served as a general during three wars (the others being Winfield Scott and Douglas MacArthur) and was one of the few Army officers promoted to brigadier general without previously holding the rank of colonel.

Awards and decorations

U.S. military decorations and service medals
  Defense Distinguished Service Medal (1970)
  Army Distinguished Service Medal (1946)
  Navy Distinguished Service Medal
  Mexican Border Service Medal
  World War I Victory Medal
  American Defense Service Medal
  American Campaign Medal
  World War II Victory Medal
  National Defense Service Medal with oak leaf cluster

Non-governmental organization awards
Masonic Grand Lodge of Indiana
 Caleb B. Smith Medal of Honor

Sons of the American Revolution
 Gold Good Citizenship Medal (1967)

American Legion
 Distinguished Service Medal (1946)
 National Commanders Award (1963)

AMVETS
 Silver Helmet Defense Award (1968)

Boy Scouts of America
 Silver Buffalo Award
 Silver Beaver Award
 Silver Antelope Award

Promotions
 Private, Indiana National Guard – 16 February 1911
 Corporal – 10 June 1912
 Sergeant – 28 May 1913
 2nd Lieutenant, NGUS – 17 June 1913
 1st Lieutenant, NGUS – 9 February 1916
 Captain, NGUS (temporary) – 27 May 1918
 Captain, Regular Army – 3 September 1920
 Major, Regular Army – 1 August 1935
 Lieutenant Colonel, Regular Army – 12 September 1940
 Colonel – Never held
 Brigadier General, Army of the United States – 16 November 1940
 Major General, Army of the United States – 28 April 1942
 Retired – 31 December 1946 (Returned to active duty the next day.)
 Lieutenant General – 23 June 1956 
 General, Retired List – 16 February 1970

See also

 General Hershy Bar – Parody of Hershey, a satirical character of the Vietnam War-era protest movement.

Notes

References
 Who Was Who in America, Vol. VII, 1977–1981. Chicago:Marquis Who's Who, p. 270.
 National Cyclopædia of American Biography, Vol. F (1942) New York: James T. White & Co. p. 47.

External links
Selective Service System
Lewis Blaine Hershey at ArlingtonCemetery.net, an unofficial website
Brainyquotes.com for Hershey
Harvard Law Review article on the legality of the "Hershey Directive"

Online Biography of General Hershey
Generals of World War II

1893 births
1977 deaths
United States Army personnel of World War I
United States Army generals of World War II
United States Army personnel of the Korean War
Burials at Arlington National Cemetery
United States Army generals
Conscription in the United States
Politics of World War II
Trine University alumni
People from Steuben County, Indiana
Military personnel from Indiana
United States Army Command and General Staff College alumni
United States Army War College alumni
Recipients of the Distinguished Service Medal (US Army)
Recipients of the Defense Distinguished Service Medal
Recipients of the Navy Distinguished Service Medal
20th-century American educators
Schoolteachers from Indiana
Franklin D. Roosevelt administration personnel
Truman administration personnel
Eisenhower administration personnel
Kennedy administration personnel
Lyndon B. Johnson administration personnel
Nixon administration personnel
Ohio State University faculty